The Y 7400 class of small shunters is France's most numerous with 488 locomotives in the production build. The first 120 were built by Decauville, with further batches built by De Dietrich (105) and Moyse (263). They have the 0-4-0 ("B") wheel arrangement, 150 kW diesel engines and mechanical transmission. They can be found all over the French network.

During 1959 Y 7192 was converted to mechanical transmission and renumbered as Y 7001. This locomotive was the prototype for the Y7400 class.

Operators
In addition to the locomotives operated by SNCF, RATP have two Y 7400 class locomotives built in 1969 by Moyse. They are numbered T 102 & T 103 and were not part of the SNCF fleet. Likewise VFLI have two Y 7400 locomotives, 088 & 089, which were originally built for CFD. VFLI have augmented their fleet with Y 7474 and Y 7684 purchased from SNCF.

Some of them are preserved by tourist railroads.

References

External links

Fleet list (SNCF): 

Diesel locomotives of France
B locomotives
Y07400
Railway locomotives introduced in 1963
Standard gauge locomotives of France

Shunting locomotives